William Corbett-Jones is an American pianist who has performed throughout the United States, Canada, Mexico and Central America, Europe, Africa, Australia, New Zealand, the Philippines, Taiwan, and Singapore.

Education 
He has participated in master classes given by Olga Samaroff, Ernest Bloch, Pablo Casals, Rosina Lhévinne, Lotte Lehmann, Ilona Kabos, János Starker, Christoph Eschenbach, Malcolm Frager, Jean-Philippe Collard, Adele Marcus and Guido Agosti.

Performance 
Corbett-Jones performed as pianist in the Alma Trio from 1971 until 1976, following the retirement of his teacher and the Alma Trio's founding pianist, Adolph Baller.

Among the artists with whom Corbett-Jones has performed are:
 Violinists: Henri Temianka, Berl Senofsky, Salvatore Accardo, and Tossy Spivakovsky, Christian Ferras, Hansheinz Schneeberger and Mischa Elman, Andor Toth and Jacob Krachmalnick, Camilla Wicks, Pierre D'Archambeau, Jassen Todorov; also rehearsal pianist for Joseph Szigeti and Yehudi Menuhin
 Violists: Paul Yarbrough, Andras Toszeghi, Ernst Wallfisch
 Cellists: Laszlo Varga, Gábor Rejtő, Joseph Shuster, Claude Starck, and Christine Walevska, William Van Den Burg, Margaret Tait
 Clarinetists: David Glazer, Rosario Mazzeo, Rudolf Stalder
 Flutists: Paul Renzi, Peter-Lukas Graf, Michel Dubos
 Oboist: Heinz Holliger
 Singers: James McCracken, Hilde Rössel-Majdan, Robert Weede, Marilyn Horne, Arthur Loosli

References

External links 
 

American classical pianists
Male classical pianists
American male pianists
Living people
Year of birth missing (living people)
Place of birth missing (living people)
21st-century classical pianists
21st-century American male musicians
21st-century American pianists